Viktor Chernomyrdin's First Cabinet acted under President of Russia Boris Yeltsin from 23 December 1992 to August 9, 1996. Until December 25, 1993 the official name was Council of Ministers, and since that date, with the coming into law of the Constitution of Russia under the term "Government".

During the formation of the cabinet, a number of Gaidar loyalists resigned from their posts.

Composition

|}

References

Chernomerdin
1992 establishments in Russia
1996 disestablishments in Russia
Cabinets established in 1992
Cabinets disestablished in 1996